Daiva Čepelienė (born 27 March 1970) is a retired female road racing cyclist from Lithuania, who competed at the 1992 Summer Olympics in Barcelona, Spain for her native country. There she finished in 20th place in the women's individual road race.

References

External links

1970 births
Living people
Lithuanian female cyclists
Cyclists at the 1992 Summer Olympics
Olympic cyclists of Lithuania
People from Kupiškis